Papa Lazarou is a fictional character in the BBC TV comedy programme The League of Gentlemen. He appears in four episodes – the first episode in the second series, the Christmas special, the final episode of the third series, and the final episode of the fourth series – and in the film The League of Gentlemen's Apocalypse. The character is part-written by and played by Reece Shearsmith. Papa Lazarou has been listed as both the 8th and 14th most popular sketch of all time with British audiences, according to the Radio Times and Channel 4, respectively.

In June 2020 The League of Gentlemen was withdrawn from distribution on Netflix due to the character being considered as blackface, following similar action taken against Little Britain by the BBC during the George Floyd protests.

Origins

The name Papa Lazarou was derived from Peter Papalazarou, who was the landlord of a flat in which Reece Shearsmith and Steve Pemberton lived. The sayings in the show are entirely fictional and for comedy purposes.

Appearances in The League of Gentlemen

Papa Lazarou's first appearance in The League of Gentlemen is in the first episode of the second series Destination: Royston Vasey. In his first appearance he runs the Pandemonium Carnival, and has three diminutive helpers called Simba, Pebbil, and Tiktik. He is seen to collect wives by forcing his way into women's homes posing as a humble peg-seller, then talking gibberish at them, invariably referring to them as 'Dave', until they hand over their wedding rings. Once they do this, he exclaims, "You’re my wife now!". His first visit to the town ends when the noses of the circus audience start bleeding simultaneously. Out-weirded by Royston Vasey, he and the other circus performers flee.

Lazarou's next appearance is during the Christmas Special, "Yule Never Leave". It is revealed that the town vicar Bernice's mother was kidnapped by Lazarou when she was a child. Lazarou then kidnaps Bernice and takes her away with members of his circus troupe at the end of the special.

In the third series, Lazarou disguises himself as an amateur theatre director called Keith Drop. This alter ego is used as a front to capture more wives. Lazarou uses the makeup tips he has gleaned from his wives to effect a very convincing transformation. As Keith he helps out in the charity shop with Reenie Calver (whose friend, Vinnie Wythenshaw, has been killed in an accident). This is merely a front for Lazarou to gain more wives. Despite being rumbled by Brian and Reenie, he manages to evade capture. It is also revealed that he imprisons his wives and anyone who tries to follow him inside circus animals. In the third series audio commentary the League revealed this is just one of a number of things (many of which haven't been shown) that he does with his captives.

Lazarou's most recent appearance was in the 2017 anniversary special, where he used a photo booth to capture a number of Royston Vasey women, including Iris and Tubbs, to create a "wife mine". It is revealed that the rights to Royston Vasey land were sold to him by current town mayor, Reverend Bernice.

Appearances in other media

During the Comic Aid Telethon to raise fund for relief in the aftermath of the South Asian Tsunami in 2004, Lazarou appeared in a specially written sketch performed live during the telethon, alongside his wife played by Mark Gatiss. During this appearance, Lazarou attempts to kidnap Miranda Richardson, before Tubbs kidnaps her instead.

Characterisation and physical appearance 
Papa Lazarou is a demonic circus master and collector of wives. He has a rasping voice and an indefinable accent. It is revealed that his skin is actually black and white and he uses pink foundation to appear Caucasian. The character is one of the most bizarre and mysterious of the League's. Some of the women in his 'book of wives', seen in series three, appear to have lived over a century ago. This hints at the character's unnatural lifespan. When he was tied to a bed in the charity shop he reveals he has the supernatural gift of being able to speak with the voices of deceased people he has never met, although it seems he cannot directly commune with the dead, as evidenced by the unconvincing medium act he performed when his circus came to town the previous year.

References

External links
The League of Gentlemen Website! - Papa Lazarou
BBC H2G2 Guide to League of Gentlemen Characters
Overview of Papa Lazarou character

British sitcom characters
Lazarou, Papa
Fictional criminals
Comedy television characters
Comedy radio characters
Television characters introduced in 2000
Male characters in radio
Male characters in television
Fictional demons and devils
Race-related controversies in television